I'm Gonna Get Your Love is a studio album by Amii Stewart released in the USA in 1981, a slightly altered version of  European album Images with the title track and "Calling For Your Love" replacing her rendition of "Great Balls Of Fire" and "Love Is Bad For Your Health". The singles released in the U.S. were "My Guy/My Girl"  with Johnny Bristol, "I'm Gonna Get Your Love", "Why'd You Have To Be So Sexy" and "Digital Love".

I'm Gonna Get Your Love remains unreleased on compact disc.

Track listing

Side A:
"I'm Gonna Get Your Love" (Raymond Rock) - 6:23
"Where Did Our Love Go" (Holland-Dozier-Holland) - 4:25
"Tonight" (Eddie Schwartz) - 3:19    
"Save This Night for Love" (Ellison Chase, William Haberman, Art Jacobson) - 3:30  
"Digital Love" (Randy Jackson, Narada Michael Walden, Allee Willis) - 3:49

Side B:
"Calling For Your Love" (William Anderson) - 4:53
"Why'd You Have to Be So Sexy" (Len Boone, Larry LaFalce) - 3:25  
"Premiere" (Barry Leng, Simon May) - 3:32  
"Don't Let Go of Me" (Randy Edelman) - 3:50  
"My Guy/My Girl" (Duet With Johnny Bristol)  (Smokey Robinson, Ronald White) - 3:59

Personnel
 Amii Stewart - vocals

Production
 Barry Leng - producer
 Simon May - producer
 Narada Michael Walden - producer
 William Anderson and Raymond Reid - producers

Alternative album editions
 Images (original European album).

References

1981 albums
Amii Stewart albums
albums produced by Narada Michael Walden